Tom Moody (November 26, 1929 – October 30, 2008) was the 49th mayor of Columbus, Ohio. A Republican, he served from 1972 to 1984. During his time in office, the Columbus Public School District was desegregated and the city's freeway system underwent significant expansion. The downtown skyline also grew during Moody's time in office. The city saw development of the Huntington Center, One Nationwide Plaza and the AEP Building. During his term, he was involved in a late night vehicle crash. Responding to suspicion that he was driving under the influence, Moody stated "I'm inspecting the city".  Tom Moody died at the age of 78, on October 30, 2008 of natural causes, at Riverside Hospital.

References

Further reading

External links 
Tom Moody at Political Graveyard

Mayors of Columbus, Ohio
1930 births
2008 deaths
Ohio Republicans
Columbus City Council members
Capital University Law School alumni
Franklin University alumni
Ohio State University alumni
20th-century American politicians